Dead reckoning is a process for estimating the value of a variable quantity by using a previous value and adding any changes.

Dead Reckoning may also refer to:

Film and television
 Dead Reckoning (1947 film), a film by John Cromwell
 Dead Reckoning (1990 film), a film by Robert Michael Lewis
 Dead Reckoning (2020 film), a film by Andrzej Bartkowiak
 The final two films of the Mission: Impossible film series that will be adapted into two feature-length parts of "Dead Reckoning":
 Part One (2023)
 Part Two (2024)
 Land of the Dead or Dead Reckoning, a 2005 film
 Dead Reckoning, the name of the firework launching vehicle from the film Land of the Dead
 "Dead Reckoning" (The Professionals), an episode of the television series
 "Dead Reckoning", an episode of the television series NCIS
 "Dead Reckoning" (Justice League Unlimited), a television episode
 "Dead Reckoning" (Person of Interest), a season 2 episode of Person of Interest

Game
Dead Reckoning (computer game), a 1997 computer game by Piranha Interactive Publishing

Literature
Dead Reckoning (novel), the eleventh novel in The Southern Vampire Mysteries by Charlaine Harris
Dead Reckoning, a novel by Kenneth Bulmer
Dead Reckoning: Memories of the 1971 Bangladesh War a book of history by Sarmila Bose
Dead Reckoning, a play by Eric Chappell
 Dead Reckoning (1978 novel),  a novel by C. Northcote Parkinson

Music
Dead Reckoning (album), a 2007 album by Threshold
Dead Reckoning Records, a record label
 Dead Reckoning, a 2001 album by Small Brown Bike
"Dead Reckoning", an instrumental composition by Clint Mansell
"Dead Reckoning", a song by Diamond Head from the album Am I Evil
"Dead Reckoning", a song by Ratt from the album Ratt 
"Dead Reckoning", a song by Petra from the album This Means War!